These are the official results of the Women's Long Jump event at the 1983 IAAF World Championships in Helsinki, Finland. There were a total number of 34 participating athletes, with two qualifying groups and the final held on Sunday 14 August 1983. The qualification mark was set at 6.40 metres.

Medalists

Schedule
All times are Eastern European Time (UTC+2)

Abbreviations
All results shown are in metres

Records

Qualifying round
Held on Saturday 1983-08-13

Final

References
 Results (Archived 2009-09-09)

L
Long jump at the World Athletics Championships
1983 in women's athletics